Liolaemus scorialis, the slag lizard, is a species of lizard in the family Liolaemidae. It is native to Chile.

References

scorialis
Reptiles described in 2015
Taxa named by Jaime Troncoso-Palacios
Taxa named by Hugo A. Díaz
Taxa named by Damien Esquerré
Reptiles of Chile
Endemic fauna of Chile